Bragaglia is an Italian surname. Notable people with the surname include:

Alberto Bragaglia (1896–1985), Italian painter
Anton Giulio Bragaglia (1890–1960), Italian Futurist photographer, film director and writer
Antonella Bragaglia (born 1973), Italian volleyball player
Arturo Bragaglia (1893–1962), Italian actor
Carlo Ludovico Bragaglia (1894–1998), Italian film director
Leonardo Bragaglia (c. 1932–2020), Italian actor, director and essayist
Pietro Bragaglia, Italian gymnast
Rolando Bragaglia, Italian figure skater

Italian-language surnames